= Zxx =

Zxx may refer to:

- zxx, a code of the ISO 639-2 and ISO 639-3 standards of language acronyms meaning "no linguistic content".
- ZXx, a codename for bodystyles of the Ford Focus in the US.
